Ushangi Margiani (born 28 January 1994) is a Georgian judoka.

References

External links
 

Male judoka from Georgia (country)
1994 births
Living people
Judoka at the 2015 European Games
European Games medalists in judo
European Games silver medalists for Georgia (country)
21st-century people from Georgia (country)